

This is a list of artists that have performed at the Montreux Jazz Festival.

Artist performances by year

1967 
The 1967 edition of the festival featured performances of three artists:

 Charles Lloyd
 Jack DeJohnette
 Keith Jarrett
 Jazz Focus 65

1968 
The 1968 edition of the festival featured performances of four artists:

 Bill Evans
 Eddie Gómez
 Jack DeJohnette
 Nina Simone

1969 
The 1969 edition of the festival featured performances of seven artists:

 Clark Terry
 Colosseum
 Eddie Harris
 Ella Fitzgerald
 George Gruntz
 Les McCann
 Ten Years After

1970 
The 1970 edition of the festival featured performances of 11 artists:

 Bill Evans
 Carlos Santana
 Champion Jack Dupree
 Clark Terry
 Eddie Gómez
 George Gruntz
 Gerry Mulligan
 Herbie Mann
 Junior Mance
 Sadao Watanabe
 Stone the Crows

1971 
The 1971 edition of the festival featured performances of ten artists:

 Aretha Franklin
 Champion Jack Dupree
 Gary Burton
 King Curtis
 Larry Coryell
 Melanie
 Placebo
 Pink Floyd
 Roberta Flack
 Roy Ayers

1972 
The 1972 edition of the festival featured performances of 15 artists:

 Bo Diddley
 Chick Corea
 Chuck Berry And The Aces 
 Herbie Mann
 Jean-Luc Ponty
 Klaus Doldinger
 Les McCann
 Lightnin' Slim
 Moses "Whispering" Smith
 Muddy Waters
 Odetta
 Stan Getz
 Stanley Clarke
 T-Bone Walker
 Willie Dixon

1973 
The 1973 edition of the festival featured performances of seven artists:

 Albert King
 Canned Heat
 Carole King
 Clarence "Gatemouth" Brown
 McCoy Tyner
 Miles Davis
 Sadao Watanabe
 Donald Byrd

1974 
The 1974 edition of the festival featured performances of 14 artists:

 Billy Cobham
 Buddy Guy
 Cecil Taylor
 Dee Dee Bridgewater
 Earl Hines
 Flora Purim
 John McLaughlin
 Junior Wells
 Larry Coryell
 Milton Nascimento
 Muddy Waters
 Randy Weston
 Sonny Rollins
 Van Morrison

1975 
The 1975 edition of the festival featured performances of 22 artists:

 Albert King
 Bill Evans
 Billy Cobham
 Charles Mingus
 Clark Terry
 Count Basie
 Dave Holland
 Didier Lockwood
 Dizzy Gillespie
 Eddie Gómez
 Eddie Harris
 Ella Fitzgerald
 Etta James
 François Lindemann
 Gerry Mulligan
 Joe Pass
 John Scofield
 Klaus Doldinger
 Larry Coryell
 Oscar Peterson
 Rory Gallagher
 Sadao Watanabe

1976 
The 1976 edition of the festival featured performances of 20 artists:

 Al Jarreau
 Art Blakey And The Jazz Messengers
 Billy Cobham
 Cecil Taylor
 Clark Terry
 George Duke
 John McLaughlin
 John Scofield
 Klaus Doldinger
 Larry Carlton
 Leonard Cohen
 Monty Alexander
 Nina Simone
 Odetta
  Shakti
 Stan Getz
 Stuff
 Sun Ra
 The Crusaders
 The Dubliners
 Wayne Shorter

1977 
The 1977 edition of the festival featured performances of 27 artists:

 Albert King
 Average White Band (AWB)
 Ben E. King
 Billy Cobham
 Bob James
 Bonnie Raitt
 Charles Mingus
 Clarence "Gatemouth" Brown
 Clark Terry
 Count Basie
 Dizzy Gillespie
 Earl Hines
 Ella Fitzgerald
 Etta James
 George Duke
 Herbie Mann
 Joe Pass
 John McLaughlin
 Klaus Doldinger
 Larry Coryell
 Monty Alexander
 Muddy Waters
 Oscar Peterson
 Paulinho Da Costa
 Rory Gallagher
 Shakti
 Stan Getz
 Stanley Clarke
 Zakir Hussain

1978 
The 1978 edition of the festival featured performances of 20 artists:

 Arturo Sandoval
 Bill Evans
 Billy Cobham
 Buddy Guy
 Chucho Valdés
 Clark Terry
 Count Basie
 Dee Dee Bridgewater
 Didier Lockwood
 Etta James
 Gilberto Gil
 James Booker
 John McLaughlin
 Junior Wells
 Larry Coryell
 Oscar Peterson
 Pee Wee Ellis
 Ray Charles
 Sonny Rollins
 Stan Getz

1979 
The 1979 edition of the festival featured performances of 20 artists:

 Al Jarreau
 Albert Collins
 B.B. King
 Champion Jack Dupree
 Chick Corea
 Clarence "Gatemouth" Brown
 Count Basie
 Elis Regina
 Ella Fitzgerald
 François Lindemann
 Herbie Hancock
 Hermeto Pascoal
 Joe Pass
 Larry Carlton
 Lee Ritenour
 Oscar Peterson
 Rory Gallagher
 Peter Tosh
 Dennis Brown
 Terry Callier
 Terry Clarke
 Wayne Shorter

1980 
The 1980 edition of the festival featured performances of 20 artists:

 Al Jarreau
 André Ceccarelli
 Art Blakey And The Jazz Messengers
 B.B. King
 Carlos Santana
 Champion Jack Dupree
 Claude Nobs
 Didier Lockwood
 Dizzy Gillespie
 Elvis Costello
 Fats Domino
 Gal Costa
 Jimmy Cliff
 Jorge Ben Jor
 Klaus Doldinger
 Luciano
 Marvin Gaye
 Pee Wee Ellis
 Rodger Fox
 Stanley Clarke
 Van Morrison

1981 
The 1981 edition of the festival featured performances of 25 artists:

 Al Jarreau
 Albert Collins
 Andreas Vollenweider
 Billy Cobham
 Biréli Lagrène
 Chick Corea
 David Sanborn
 Dizzy Gillespie
 Elba Ramalho
 Ella Fitzgerald
 Herbie Hancock
 James Brown
 James Moody
 John McLaughlin
 Larry Carlton
 Larry Coryell
 Marcus Miller
 McCoy Tyner
 Mike Oldfield
 Monty Alexander
 Nina Simone
 Oscar Peterson
 Rodger Fox
 Randy Crawford
 Robben Ford
 Stray Cats
 Terry Clarke

1982 
The 1982 edition of the festival featured performances of 22 artists:

 Alceu Valença
 B.B. King
 Billy Cobham
 Bobby McFerrin
 Claude Nobs
 Dean Brown
 Didier Lockwood
 Dizzy Gillespie
 Eddie Gómez
 François Lindemann
 Gilberto Gil
 Jackson Browne
 Jimmy Cliff
 Joe Sample
 Larry Graham
 Milton Nascimento
 Ney Matogrosso
 Rickie Lee Jones
 Stevie Ray Vaughan
 Sugar Blue
 The Crusaders
 Crossfire

1983 
The 1983 edition of the festival featured performances of 21 artists:

 Art Blakey And The Jazz Messengers
 Bill Laswell
 Billy Cobham
 Buddy Guy
 Caetano Veloso
 Charles Lloyd
 Clark Terry
 Claude Nobs
 Fats Domino
 Freddie Hubbard
 Herbie Hancock
 Herbie Mann
 John Lee Hooker
 João Bosco
 Kenny Barron
 Naoya Matsuoka
 Ney Matogrosso
 Pino Daniele
 Pyramid
 Rickie Lee Jones
 Ronald Shannon Jackson and the Decoding Society
 Sugar Blue
 Willie Dixon

1984 
The 1984 edition of the festival featured performances of 22 artists:

 B.B. King
 Bill Evans
 Bobby McFerrin
 Chris Rea
 Darryl Jones
 Casiopea
 David Sanborn
 Dee Dee Bridgewater
 Elba Ramalho
 Freddie Hubbard
 Gianna Nannini
 John McLaughlin
 John Scofield
 Klaus Doldinger
 Miles Davis
 Monty Alexander
 Paco De Lucia
 Rickie Lee Jones
 Robert Cray
 Sade
 Stephan Eicher
 Steps Ahead
 The Itals
 Van Morrison

1985 
The 1985 edition of the festival featured performances of 16 artists:

 Bob James
 Darryl Jones
 Dave Grusin
 Dean Brown
 Flora Purim
 Jack DeJohnette
 John Scofield
 Lee Ritenour
 Leonard Cohen
 Miles Davis
 Nina Hagen
 Randy Weston
 Rory Gallagher
 Ruben Blades
 Stevie Ray Vaughan
 Trilok Gurtu

1986 
The 1986 edition of the festival featured performances of 33 artists:

 Al Di Meola
 Al Jarreau
 Angélique Kidjo
 Anita Baker
 Arturo Sandoval
 Chaka Khan
 Chris Rea
 David Sanborn
 Dr. John
 Eddie Gómez
 Elba Ramalho
 Eric Clapton
 Freddie Hubbard
 Gary Burton
 George Benson
 George Duke
 Gilberto Gil
 Greg Phillinganes
 Herbie Hancock
 John Scofield
 McCoy Tyner
 Miles Davis
 Otis Rush
 Phil Collins
 Randy Crawford
 Robben Ford
 Robert Cray
 Sadao Watanabe
 Sade
 Simply Red
 Stephan Eicher
 Talk Talk
 Wayne Shorter

1987 
The 1987 edition of the festival featured performances of 24 artists:

 André Ceccarelli
 B.B. King
 Ben E. King
 Beth Carvalho
 Curtis Mayfield
 Dee Dee Bridgewater
 Dizzy Gillespie
 Eliane Elias
 George Duke
 Herbie Hancock
 Ivan Lins
 Joe Cocker
 John McLaughlin
 João Bosco
 Kenny Barron
 Los Lobos
 Monty Alexander
 Nina Simone
 Os Paralamas do Sucesso
 Paco De Lucia
 Paolo Conte
 Sadao Watanabe
 Stan Getz
 The Manhattan Transfer
 The Pretenders
 Katie Webster
 Keith Jarrett
 Hawk on Flight
 Jean-Luc Ponty

1988 
The 1988 edition of the festival featured performances of 34 artists:

 Abdullah Ibrahim
 Biréli Lagrène
 Bobby McFerrin
 Booker T. Jones
 Carlos Santana
 Charles Lloyd
 Chick Corea
 Clark Terry
 David Sanborn
 Eddie Gómez
 Eddie Harris
 George Benson
 George Duke
 Gerry Mulligan
 Herbie Hancock
 James Moody
 James Morrison (brass)
 James Taylor
 Jean-Luc Ponty
 Joe Satriani
 Kassav'
 Lee Ritenour
 Les McCann
 Martinho Da Vila
 Miles Davis
 Milton Nascimento
 Monty Alexander
 Randy Weston
 Robben Ford
 Salif Keita
 Stanley Clarke
 Terri Lyne Carrington
 Titãs
 Tracy Chapman
 Wayne Shorter

1989 
The 1989 edition of the festival featured performances of 32 artists:

 Adriana Calcanhotto
 Al Di Meola
 Albert King
 B.B. King
 Biréli Lagrène
 Blues Brothers Band
 Buckwheat Zydeco
 Caetano Veloso
 Chaka Khan
 Darryl Jones
 Dianne Reeves
 Dizzy Gillespie
 Eliane Elias
 Elvis Costello
 Etta James
 George Benson
 George Duke
 Herbie Hancock
 James Morrison (brass)
 Joan Baez
 Joe Jackson
 João Bosco
 Larry Carlton
 Larry Coryell
 Little Feat
 McCoy Tyner
 Miles Davis
 Paolo Conte
 Stanley Clarke
 Steps Ahead
 The Manhattan Transfer
 Van Morrison
 Youssou N'Dour

1990 
The 1990 edition of the festival featured performances of 37 artists:

 Al Jarreau
 Albert Collins
 André Ceccarelli
 Arturo Sandoval
 B.B. King
 Beth Carvalho
 Brian May & Kerry Ellis
 Caetano Veloso
 Claude Nobs
 Count Basie
 Dave Holland
 David Sanborn
 Dee Dee Bridgewater
 Dizzy Gillespie
 Eddie Gómez
 Etta James
 Flora Purim
 George Benson
 Gonzalo Rubalcaba
 Herbie Hancock
 Jack DeJohnette
 James Moody
 Joe Sample
 John Lee Hooker
 Jorge Ben Jor
 Kool & The Gang
 Lee Ritenour
 Les McCann
 Little Feat
 Miles Davis
 Nina Simone
 Ofra Haza
 Rachelle Ferrell
 Randy Crawford
 Roberta Flack
 Sting
 Van Morrison
 Wayne Shorter

1991 
The 1991 edition of the festival featured performances of 39 artists:

 Al Jarreau
 Allen Toussaint
 André Ceccarelli
 B.B. King
 Bill Evans
 Billy Preston
 Bonnie Raitt
 Camarón de la Isla
 Chaka Khan
 Clark Terry
 Claude Nobs
 Count Basie
 Darryl Jones
 David Sanborn
 Dianne Reeves
 Deee-lite
 Eddie Gómez
 Elvis Costello
 François Lindemann
 Gal Costa
 George Benson
 George Duke
 George Gruntz
 Gianna Nannini
 Gilberto Gil
 Greg Phillinganes
 Herbie Hancock
 Jean-Luc Ponty
 Jimmy Cliff
 Kid Creole and the Coconuts
 Miles Davis
 Milton Nascimento
 Otis Rush
 Quincy Jones
 Rachelle Ferrell
 Ray Charles
 Robert Cray
 Stanley Clarke
 Sting
 Tomatito
 Tori Amos
 Toto
 Wayne Shorter

1992 
The 1992 edition of the festival featured performances of 25 artists:

 Albert Collins
 Annie Lennox
 Arthur H
 Bobby McFerrin
 Buddy Guy
 Clark Terry
 Claude Nobs
 Earl Thomas
 Eric Clapton
 Gary Burton
 George Duke
 Gonzalo Rubalcaba
 Herbie Hancock
 Joe Cocker
 Makoto Ozone
 Mick Hucknall
 Pierre Audetat
 Quincy Jones
 Rachelle Ferrell
 Randy Crawford
 Rita Lee
 Simply Red
 Tony Joe White
 Tori Amos
 Tracy Chapman
 Wayne Shorter

1993 
The 1993 edition of the festival featured performances of 53 artists:

 Abdullah Ibrahim
 Al Di Meola
 Al Green
 Al Jarreau
 André Ceccarelli
 B.B. King
 Barbara Hendricks
 Caetano Veloso
 Carlos Santana
 Chaka Khan
 Charles Lloyd
 Chick Corea
 Chris Isaak
 Dave Holland
 David Sanborn
 Dee Dee Bridgewater
 Dennis Chambers
 Diana Miranda
 Didier Lockwood
 Eddie Harris
 Etta James
 Fats Domino
 François Lindemann
 George Duke
 Gilberto Gil
 Greg Phillinganes
 Herbie Hancock
 Ira Coleman
 Jacky Terrasson
 James Brown
 James Morrison (brass)
 Joe Sample
 John McLaughlin
 John Scofield
 Joshua Redman
 Klaus Doldinger
 Larry Graham
 Marcus Miller
 Margareth Menezes
 Monty Alexander
 Muddy Waters
 Paolo Conte
 Paulinho Da Costa
 Rachelle Ferrell
 Richard Galliano
 Robben Ford
 Robert Plant
 Salif Keita
 Sens Unik
 Third World
 Us3
 Ute Lemper
 Zap Mama

1994 
The 1994 edition of the festival featured performances of 38 artists:

 Al Di Meola
 Andreas Vollenweider
 Angélique Kidjo
 Betty Carter
 Bob Dylan
 Bobby McFerrin
 Brian May & Kerry Ellis
 Christian McBride
 Daniela Mercury
 Dean Brown
 Diana Miranda
 Eddie Gómez
 Eliane Elias
 Fito Paez
 Gotthard
 Herbie Hancock
 Isamel Lo
 Ivan Lins
 Jacky Terrasson
 James Morrison (brass)
 Jean-Luc Ponty
 John Scofield
 Johnny Cash
 Jorge Ben Jor
 Joshua Redman
 Marcus Miller
 Monty Alexander
 Natalie Cole
 Ney Matogrosso
 Noa
 Pat Metheny
 Paquito D'Rivera
 Paul Rodgers
 Pierre Audetat
 Randy Weston
 Rory Gallagher
 Roy Hargrove
 Sens Unik
 Stanley Clarke
 Stephan Eicher
 Terri Lyne Carrington
 The Roots
 Van Morrison

1995 
The 1995 edition of the festival featured performances of 30 artists:

 Arturo Sandoval
 B.B. King
 Baaba Maal
 Chaka Khan
 Christian McBride
 Dennis Chambers
 Dianne Reeves
 Dr. John
 Gal Costa
 Gary Moore
 George Benson
 Jacky Terrasson
 James Brown
 James Taylor
 Jamie Jones (All 4 One)
 Jamiroquai
 John McLaughlin
 João Bosco
 Keltic Possé
 Marianne Faithfull
 Monty Alexander
 Olodum
 Randy Crawford
 Randy Weston
 Salif Keita
 The Manhattan Transfer
 Tony Bennett
 Tuck & Patti
 Van Morrison
 Youssou N'Dour

1996 
The 1996 edition of the festival featured performances of 45 artists:

 Al Di Meola
 Al Jarreau
 Bo Diddley
 Carlos Santana
 Chaka Khan
 Clarence "Gatemouth" Brown
 David Sanborn
 Dean Brown
 Deep Purple
 Elvis Costello
 François Lindemann
 Gabrielle
 George Benson
 George Duke
 Greg Phillinganes
 Herbie Hancock
 Isaac Hayes
 James Morrison (brass)
 John McLaughlin
 Keb' Mo'
 Kenny Barron
 Lenny White
 Manu Katché
 Marcus Miller
 Maria Bethânia
 McCoy Tyner
 Mick Hucknall
 Milton Nascimento
 Oscar Peterson
 Otis Rush
 Paco De Lucia
 Patti Austin
 Phil Collins
 Pierre Audetat
 Quincy Jones
 Richard Galliano
 Simply Red
 Sonny Emory
 Stephan Eicher
 Tony Bennett
 Us3
 Van Morrison
 Wayne Shorter
 ZZ Top
 Zucchero

1997 
The 1997 edition of the festival featured performances of 48 artists:

 Angélique Kidjo
 Avishai Cohen 
 B.B. King
 Bobby McFerrin
 Brad Mehldau
 Chick Corea
 Chico Cesar
 Chris Rea
 Chucho Valdés
 Claude Nobs
 Dave Holland
 David Sanborn
 Diana Krall
 Doug Wimbish
 Earth, Wind & Fire
 Emerson, Lake & Palmer
 Eric Clapton
 Faithless
 Gary Burton
 Gary Moore
 George Duke
 Gilberto Gil
 Herbie Hancock
 Ira Coleman
 Jack DeJohnette
 Joe Sample
 John Scofield
 Jorge Ben Jor
 Joshua Redman
 Kronos Quartet
 Larry Carlton
 Larry Graham
 Lee Ritenour
 Madeleine Peyroux
 Makoto Ozone
 Marcus Miller
 Michael Rose
 Monty Alexander
 Patti Austin
 Pee Wee Ellis
 Rachelle Ferrell
 Ray Charles
 Robert Cray
 Sheryl Crow
 Sonny Emory
 Supertramp
 Van Morrison
 Ziggy Marley

1998 
The 1998 edition of the festival featured performances of 43 artists:

 Al Jarreau
 Alceu Valença
 B.B. King
 Billy Cobham
 Bob Dylan
 Bootsy Collins
 Buddy Guy
 Candy Dulfer
 Carlos Santana
 Charlie Musselwhite
 Cubanismo!
 Dennis Chambers
 Earth, Wind & Fire
 Erik Truffaz
 George Benson
 George Duke
 Gilberto Gil
 Gonzalo Rubalcaba
 Herbie Hancock
 Ivete Sangalo
 Jeff Beck
 John McLaughlin
 Jorge Ben Jor
 Keb' Mo'
 Klaus Doldinger
 Laurent Garnier
 Les McCann
 Mavis Staples
 Morcheeba
 Nils Landgren
 Nils Petter Molvaer
 Oleta Adams
 Pee Wee Ellis
 Phil Collins
 Polar
 Ray Lema
 Sadao Watanabe
 Sens Unik
 Sonny Emory
 Terry Callier
 The Corrs
 Tower Of Power
 Van Morrison
 Will Calhoun

1999 
The 1999 edition of the festival featured performances of 50 artists:

 Al Green
 Alanis Morissette
 Asher Selector
 B.B. King
 Baaba Maal
 Ben Harper
 Beverley Knight
 Blondie
 Bob James
 Charles Lloyd
 Chico Cesar
 Chucho Valdés
 Clark Terry
 Claude Nobs
 Daniela Mercury
 David Sanborn
 Dean Brown
 Earl 16
 Elba Ramalho
 Elvis Costello
 Fourplay
 Fred Wesley
 Gary Moore
 George Duke
 Gianna Nannini
 Herbie Hancock
 Ira Coleman
 James Taylor
 John McLaughlin
 Larry Carlton
 Lenny White
 Manu Katché
 Marianne Faithfull
 Milton Nascimento
 Natacha Atlas
 Ney Matogrosso
 Nils Landgren
 Noa
 R.E.M.
 Rachelle Ferrell
 Rickie Lee Jones
 Robben Ford
 Sonny Emory
 Stanley Clarke
 Terri Lyne Carrington
 The Roots
 Trilok Gurtu
 Van Morrison
 Zakir Hussain
 dEUS

2000 
The 2000 edition of the festival featured performances of 39 artists:

 Al Jarreau
 André Rio
 Angie Stone
 Asher Selector
 B.B. King
 Blackalicious
 Brad Mehldau
 Candy Dulfer
 Clarence "Gatemouth" Brown
 D'Angelo
 David Sanborn
 Deep Purple
 Diana Krall
 Elba Ramalho
 Emilíana Torrini
 Everything But the Girl
 Fazıl Say
 George Benson
 George Duke
 Horace Andy
 Jack DeJohnette
 Joe Sample
 Joe Satriani
 Lamb
 Leo Tardin
 Lionel Richie
 Lou Reed
 Lovebugs
 Martinho Da Vila
 Mos Def
 Nils Petter Molvaer
 Richard Bona
 Ruben Blades
 Salif Keita
 Shemekia Copeland
 Suzanne Vega
 The Manhattan Transfer
 Ute Lemper
 Will Calhoun
 Youssou N'Dour

2001 
The 2001 edition of the festival featured performances of 51 artists:

 Alanis Morissette
 Avishai Cohen 
 B.B. King
 Beck
 Bob Dylan
 Bobby McFerrin
 Brian May & Kerry Ellis
 Chick Corea
 Chris Botti
 Christian McBride
 Dean Brown
 Dianne Reeves
 Doug Wimbish
 Gary Moore
 George Duke
 Gilberto Gil
 Goldfrapp
 Herbie Hancock
 Horace Andy
 James Morrison (brass)
 Jimmy Page
 John McLaughlin
 Jorge Ben Jor
 Klaus Doldinger
 Larry Carlton
 Living Colour
 Manu Katché
 Marcus Miller
 Milton Nascimento
 Neil Cowley
 Neil Young
 Paco De Lucia
 Patti Smith
 Run DMC
 Rachelle Ferrell
 Richard Bona
 Robert Plant
 Saul Williams
 Shakti
 Sigur Rós
 Sting
 Talvin Singh
 Terri Lyne Carrington
 Terry Callier
 The Temptations
 Tricky
 Trilok Gurtu
 Van Morrison
 Wayne Shorter
 Will Calhoun
 Zakir Hussain

2002 
The 2002 edition of the festival featured performances of 75 artists:

 Air
 Al Jarreau
 Amadou & Mariam
 Angie Stone
 Angélique Kidjo
 Antibalas Afrobeat Orchestra
 Asian Dub Foundation
 B.B. King
 Biréli Lagrène
 Buddy Guy
 Bush
 Caetano Veloso
 Cake
 Candy Dulfer
 Capleton
 Chris Rea
 Christian McBride
 Claude Nobs
 Cornelius
 Cornershop
 Daniela Mercury
 Dave Holland
 David Bowie
 David Sanborn
 Dennis Alcapone
 Detroit Innovators
 Diana Miranda
 DJ Logic
 Dreadzone
 Erykah Badu
 Esbjörn Svensson Trio
 Fred Galliano & The African Divas
 Gabrielle
 Garbage
 Gary Burton
 Gemma Hayes
 Goo
 Herbie Hancock
 Ike Turner
 Irmin Schmidt & Kumo
 Isaac Hayes
 Jamiroquai
 Joe Cocker
 Joe Sample
 Joe Satriani
 John Scofield
 João Bosco
 Keith Jarrett
 Makoto Ozone
 Marianne Faithfull
 Mercury Rev
 Mirko Loko
 Miss Kittin
 Mt. Sims
 Muse
 Paul Simon
 Pierre Audetat
 Pierre-Yves Borgeaud
 Rahzel
 Ramon Valle
 Ratdog
 Richard Galliano
 Slayer
 Soulfly
 Speedy J
 Stephan Eicher
 Terri Lyne Carrington
 The Matthew Herbert Big Band
 The Notwist
 Thomas Dutronc
 UB40
 Us3
 Wanda Sá
 Watcha
 Wayne Shorter
 Youssou N'Dour

2003 
The 2003 edition of the festival featured performances of 60 artists:

 Asher Selector
 Baptiste Trotignon Trio
 Beth Orton
 Blackalicious
 Brendan Benson
 Chico Cesar
 Craig David
 Cypress Hill
 Echoboy
 Falamansa
 George Benson
 Gilberto Gil
 Goldfrapp
 Herbert Grönemeyer
 Jacky Terrasson
 Jair Oliveira
 Jamiroquai
 Jethro Tull
 Jimi Tenor & Big Band
 Joe Jackson
 Joe Sample
 Laurent Garnier
 Laurie Anderson
 Lockdown Project
 Maria Bethânia
 Marius Vernescu
 Masha
 Mercan Dede
 Michel Jonasz
 Mick Hucknall
 Mirko Loko
 Mogwai
 Nada Surf
 Natalie Cole
 Noa
 Pierre Audetat
 Prince Alla
 Radiohead
 Randy Crawford
 Ray Parker Jr.
 Richard Galliano
 Simply Red
 Stereophonics
 Susheela Raman
 The Blues Brothers
 The Crusaders
 The Flaming Lips
 The Pretenders
 The Rapture
 The Roots
 Tom McRae
 Tony Bennett
 Tricky
 Tuck & Patti
 Turin Brakes
 Van Morrison
 Vivian
 Yes
 ZZ Top
 Zorg

2004 
The 2004 edition of the festival featured performances of 105 artists:

 !!!
 16 Horsepower
 Air
 Al Jarreau
 Alicia Keys
 Amp Fiddler
 André Ceccarelli
 Angélique Kidjo
 Archive
 Asher Selector
 Avril
 B.B. King
 Bang Gang
 Barbara Hendricks
 Blonde Redhead
 Bluechel & Von Deylen
 Bobby McFerrin
 Bobby Parker
 Bryan Ferry
 Carlos Santana
 Cheap Trick
 Chic
 Christian Scott
 Clarence "Gatemouth" Brown
 Deep Purple
 Dido
 Earl Thomas
 Erick Sermon
 Faithless
 Feist
 Gary Burton
 Gentleman
 George (aka Dr. Funkenstein) Clinton
 Gianna Nannini
 Gonzalo Rubalcaba
 Herbie Hancock
 Inga Swearingen
 James Taylor
 Jamie Cullum
 Jamie Oehlers
 John Scofield
 Jorge Ben Jor
 Joss Stone
 João Bosco
 Kings of Convenience
 Korn
 Little Dreams Foundation
 Louie Vega & His Elements of Life
 Luciano
 Madlib feat. Jay Dee
 Magnus Lindgren
 Michael von der Heide
 Michel Camilo Trio
 Mono
 Mos Def
 Natacha Atlas
 Nega 
 Nicola Conte
 Nina Hagen
 Orchestra Baobab
 Os Paralamas do Sucesso
 Oumou Sangaré
 P.M.T.
 PJ Harvey
 Patti Austin
 Patti LaBelle
 Paul Jermaine
 Phil Collins
 Ralph Myerz & The Jack Herren Band
 Raul Midon
 Ravi Coltrane
 Renee Olstead
 Revelação
 Robi Weber
 Rokia Traoré
 Sandii
 Santana Salvador
 Scissor Sisters
 Seal
 Sean Paul
 Seeed
 Sens Unik
 Shakti
 Solomon Burke
 Soulsurvivors
 Stacey Kent
 Streichmusik Alder
 Suzanne Vega
 Talvin Singh
 The Bad Plus
 The Bees
 The Brown Sisters
 The Corrs
 The Divine Comedy & Lausanne Sinfonietta
 The Eighties Matchbox B-Line Disaster
 The Music
 The World Quintet
 Tigran Hamasyan
 Ute Lemper
 Van Morrison
 Wax Poetic
 Wayne Shorter
 Wire Daisies
 Yami Bolo
 Zakir Hussain
 Zucchero

2005 
The 2005 edition of the festival featured performances of 110 artists:

 5th Element Crew
 Al Di Meola
 Alice Cooper
 ...And You Will Know Us by the Trail of Dead
 Anna Serafinska
 Antal Pusztai
 Antony And The Johnsons
 Apocalyptica
 Arturo Sandoval
 Audioslave
 B.B. King
 Barrington Levy
 Beth Carvalho
 Big Pants
 Billy Preston
 Black Twang
 Blondie
 Bobby McFerrin
 Bonnie Prince Billy
 Booker T. Jones
 Brian Wilson
 Bright Eyes
 Chic
 Christoph Siegrist
 Cibelle
 CocoRosie
 Common
 Crosby, Stills & Nash
 Daniela Mercury
 David Rodigan
 Dean Brown
 Death In Vegas
 Doug Wimbish
 Eagles of Death Metal
 Eliane Elias
 Elvis Costello
 Emilíana Torrini
 Fantômas
 Fazıl Say
 Garbage
 George Benson
 George Duke
 Gonzales
 Grégoire Maret
 Harold López-Nussa Torres
 Heritage Orchestra
 Houston Swing Engine
 Ibrahim Ferrer
 Isaac Hayes
 Isis
 Ivete Sangalo
 James Blunt
 Jamie Lidell
 Jean Grae
 Jean-Luc Ponty
 Joanna Newsom
 Joe Sample
 John Medeski
 Jorge Aragao
 José Feliciano
 Juliette Gréco
 Kasabian
 Kraftwerk
 LCD Soundsystem
 Laura Pausini
 Lauryn Hill
 Leonid Agutin
 Lisa Stansfield
 Lovebugs
 M83
 Magnus Lindgren
 Margareth Menezes
 Marianne Faithfull
 McCoy Tyner
 Michel Jonasz
 Oscar Peterson
 Patti Smith
 Peter Cincotti
 Plantlife
 Queens Of The Stone Age
 Randy Crawford
 Raphael Saadiq
 Ravi Coltrane
 Ray Baretto
 Richard Bona
 Robert Botos
 Robert Cray
 Roberta Flack
 Saul Williams
 Seu Jorge
 Solomon Burke
 Soulwax
 Stanley Clarke
 Steps Ahead
 Steve Earle
 The Bravery
 The Corrs
 The Dears
 The Manhattan Transfer
 The Others
 The Roots
 The Young Gods
 Tom McRae
 Tom Zé
 Tori Amos
 Trio Grande
 Underworld
 Will Calhoun
 Zap Mama
 Zeca Pagodinho

2006 
The 2006 edition of the festival featured performances of 99 artists:

 Adam Green
 Al Jarreau
 Amon Tobin
 Arthur H
 Atmosphere
 B.B. King
 Beverley Knight
 Bilal
 Brother Ali
 Bryan Adams
 Bugz In The Attic
 Chris Botti
 Clap Your Hands Say Yeah
 Cobblestone Jazz
 Curtis Stigers
 Davell Crawford
 David Walters
 Dean Brown
 Deep Purple
 Deftones
 Diana Krall
 Donovan
 Eek A Mouse
 Eels
 Erik Truffaz
 Fourplay
 George Duke
 Gilberto Gil
 Gotan project
 Gotthard
 Guess What
 Harold López-Nussa Torres
 Herbert & Dani Siciliano
 Herbie Hancock
 Horace Andy
 Iggy Pop & The Stooges
 Jack DeJohnette
 James Holden
 Kid Koala
 Klaus Doldinger
 Koop
 Kruger
 Larry Carlton
 Leela James
 Luciano
 Marcelo D2
 Maria Rita
 Martin Luther
 Martinho Da Vila
 Massive Attack
 Mathew Jonson
 Mick Hucknall
 Mogwai
 Morrissey
 Murcof
 Narodniki The Laptop Supergroup
 Nathan Fake
 New Orleans All Star
 Ney Matogrosso
 Nikoletta Szoke
 Omara Portuondo
 Paco De Lucia
 Paolo Conte
 Paolo Nutini
 Phat Kat and Pete Rock
 Poni Hoax
 Prince Buster
 Prince Malachi
 Q-Bert
 Randy Crawford
 Raul Midon
 Richie Hawtin
 Royseven
 Sean Paul
 Sergio Mendes
 Sigur Rós
 Simply Red
 Soil & Pimp
 Solomon Burke
 Sons and Daughters
 Stanley Clarke
 Starch
 Starsailor
 Sting
 Talvin Singh
 Terry Callier
 Terry Callier and His Band
 The Clarke Duke Project
 The Harmony Harmoneers
 The Strokes
 Till Brönner
 Tower Of Power
 Tracy Chapman
 Trio Beyond
 Twinkle Brothers
 Van Morrison
 Venus
 Wire Daisies
 Zakir Hussain
 dEUS

2007 
The 2007 edition of the festival featured performances of 84 artists:

 Abd Al Malik
 Al Jarreau
 Alceu Valença
 Asher Selector
 Beastie Boys
 Beck
 Beenie Man
 Beth Carvalho
 Beverley Knight
 Bilal
 Bonaparte
 Booker T. Jones
 Bouddha Monk
 Brad Mehldau
 Candy Dulfer
 Celyane
 Damon Albarn
 DJ James Holroyd
 Dr. John
 Electrelane
 Erik Truffaz
 Faithless
 Fauve & Raphelson
 Foreigner
 Francis Hime
 Galaxy 2 Galaxy
 Gary Burton
 George Benson
 Gianna Nannini
 Gomm
 Heaven & Hell
 Herman Dune
 Horace Andy
 Idrissa Diop
 India.Arie
 Isamel Lo
 Jake Hertzog
 Jimmy Cliff
 John Legend
 John Medeski
 John Scofield
 Keren Ann
 Kid Chocolat Vs Asia Argento
 Kristin Berardi
 Lambchop
 Larry Carlton
 Laurent Garnier
 Living Colour
 M. Ward
 Maria Bethânia
 Motörhead
 Mr Hudson & The Library
 Nemo
 Norah Jones
 Olodum
 Paolo Nutini
 Pet Shop Boys
 Pharoahe Monch
 Placebo
 Pop Levi
 Prince
 Raul Midon
 Rickie Lee Jones
 Robben Ford
 Rocé
 Roger Hodgson
 Saskia Laroo
 Seven
 Solomon Burke
 Son Of Dave
 Sophie Hunger
 Spank Rock
 The B-52's
 The Chemical Brothers
 The Good, the Bad & the Queen
 Tokyo Ska Paradise Orchestra
 Tori Amos
 Unkle
 Van Morrison
 Wilco
 Will Calhoun
 William White
 Wu-Tang Clan
 Youssou N'Dour

2008 
The 2008 edition of the festival featured performances of 128 artists:

 A Few Good Men
 Adele
 Al Di Meola
 Alicia Keys
 Andy Milne & Grégoire Maret
 Asher Selector
 Ayekoo Drummers Ghana
 Azid Family
 Babyshambles
 Belleruche
 Billy Gibbons
 Blood Red Shoes
 Brendan Benson
 Brisa Roché
 Buddy Guy
 Buika
 CDL Jazz Orchestra
 CSS
 Camille
 Chaka Khan
 Chezidek
 Chick Corea
 Chico Cesar
 Dan Le Sac Vs Scroobius Pip
 Das Pop
 Davell Crawford
 Day One
 Deep Purple
 DJ Logic
 DJ Marky & Stamina MC
 EPMD
 Earl 16
 Eddy Grant
 Elba Ramalho
 Ellen Allien
 Erykah Badu
 Fiji
 Gilberto Gil
 Gnarls Barkley
 Gossip
 Greis
 Groove 
 Hamilton De Holanda
 Herbie Hancock
 Hercules and Love Affair
 Hocus Pocus
 I.Trio
 Interpol
 James Moody
 Jamie Lidell
 Javier Limón
 Jill Scott
 Joan Baez
 Joe Jackson
 Joe Sample
 John Mayall & The Bluesbreakers
 Jonatha Brooke
 João Bosco
 Just Blaze
 Kassette
 Lenny Kravitz
 Lenny White
 Leonard Cohen
 Lightspeed Champion
 Madness
 Magnus Lindgren
 Mart'nália
 Melody Gardot
 Michael Rose
 Mick Hucknall
 Milton Nascimento & Trio Jobim
 Monty Alexander
 Moriarty
 N.E.R.D.
 Nana Mouskouri
 Naturally 7
 Nazareth
 Neon Neon
 Nils Landgren
 Nôze
 Otis Taylor
 Paolo Nutini
 Patti Austin
 Paul Jermaine
 Paulinho Da Costa
 Pepe Lienhard
 Petula Clark
 Pharrell Williams
 Grand Pianoramax
 Pitingo
 Prince Alla
 Quincy Jones
 Quique Neira
 Randy Crawford
 Return to Forever
 Richard Galliano
 Richard Galliano and Tangaria Quartet
 Robert Cray
 Roberta Flack
 Ryan Bingham
 Ryan Shaw
 Saigon (rapper)
 Sam Sparro
 Santigold
 Saxon
 Sheryl Crow
 Sly Johnson
 Sophie Hunger
 Sorgente
 Stanley Clarke
 Stevans
 Sylford Walker
 The Crusaders
 The Heavy
 The Kills
 The Kissaway Trail
 The National
 The Raconteurs
 The Rumble Strips
 The Ting Tings
 The Whip
 Tobias Preisig
 Tower Of Power
 Travis
 Valeska
 Vampire Weekend
 Yael Naïm
 k.d. Lang

2009 
The 2009 edition of the festival featured performances of 136 artists:

 Adam Green
 Alain Clark
 Alela Diane
 Alice Cooper
 Alice Russell
 Allen Toussaint
 André Rio
 Angélique Kidjo
 Antony And The Johnsons
 Ayekoo Drummers Ghana
 B.B. King
 Baaba Maal
 Bettye LaVette
 Bill Evans
 Bill Laswell
 Birdy Nam Nam
 Bitty McLean
 Black Milk
 Blind Boys Of Alabama
 Bloc Party
 Boo Boo Davis
 CTI All Star Band 2009
 Chaka Khan
 Chickenfoot
 Chris Gall Trio feat. Enik
 Chucho Valdés
 Claude Nobs
 Cubanismo!
 Daniel Powter
 Dave Matthews Band
 David Sanborn
 Derek Trucks
 Diana Miranda
 Die Ärzte
 DJ Vincz Lee
 Earth, Wind & Fire
 Elew
 Elkee
 Emil Ibrahim Quartet
 Emily Loizeau
 Esser
 Everlast
 Flora Purim
 Francisco Mela
 Gadsbi
 General Elektriks
 George Benson
 George Duke
 Giovanni Hidalgo & Horacio Hernandez
 Grace Jones
 Harold López-Nussa Torres
 Herbie Hancock
 Herman Dune
 Hugh Coltman
 James Yuill
 Jamie Cullum
 Jedi Mind Tricks
 Jeff Beck
 Joe Satriani
 John Fogerty
 John McLaughlin
 John Scofield
 Kakkmaddafakka
 Kenny Babyface Edmonds
 Klaxons
 Kool & The Gang
 La Coka Nostra
 La Fouine
 Lang Lang
 Lee Ritenour
 Leila Arab
 Lily Allen
 Little Brother
 Lizz Wright
 MXX Allstar
 Madeleine Peyroux
 Magnus Lindgren
 Marcus Miller
 Marianne Faithfull
 Mc Coy Tyner Trio
 McCoy Tyner
 Melody Gardot
 Mingus
 Monty Alexander
 Mr. Lif
 Naive New Beaters
 Naturally 7
 New York Salsa All Stars
 Nils Landgren
 Nono Germano
 Noisettes
 Olivier Koundouno
 Oscar D'León
 OuterSpace
 Passion Pit
 Peter Cincotti
 Pony Pony Run Run
 Pop
 Prince
 Q-Tip
 Rachelle Ferrell
 Raphael Saadiq
 Ray Lema
 Ray Parker Jr.
 Scott Matthew
 Seal
 Sebastien Schuller
 Shakra
 Wayne Shorter
 Ska Nerfs
 Solange La Frange
 Solomon Burke
 Stanley Clarke
 Status Quo
 Steely Dan
 Stephan Eicher
 Steve Winwood
 Susan Tedeschi
 Sweet Georgia Brown
 Take Me Home
 Talib Kweli
 The Asteroids Galaxy Tour
 The Bewitched Hand
 The Black Eyed Peas
 The Rakes
 The Sound of the Fridge
 The Swedish ACT Allstars
 Third World
 Trybez
 Underworld
 Variety Lab
 We Have Band
 Wyclef Jean
 Yuksek
 Zulfugar Baghirov Quartet
 Zurich University Of Arts
 finn & Eicher

2010 
The 2010 edition of the festival featured performances of 108 artists:

 Aeroplane
 Air
 Al Jarreau
 Alfredo Rodriguez
 Angélique Kidjo
 Aṣa
 Baaba Maal
 Beach House
 Ben Harper
 Billy Cobham
 Billy Idol
 Blood Red Shoes
 Brad Mehldau
 Brian Wilson
 Broken Bells
 Bryan Ferry
 Buddy Guy
 Charlotte Gainsbourg
 Chew Lips
 Chick Corea
 Chris Garneau
 Christian McBride
 Chromeo
 CocoRosie
 Cody
 Damian Marley
 De La Soul
 Delphic
 Diana Krall
 Eli "Paperboy" Reed and The True Loves
 Elvis Costello
 Emmanuelle Seigner
 Erykah Badu
 Fanfarlo
 Francisco Mela
 Féfé
 Gary Moore
 Ghinzu Club Show
 Gigi Radics
 Gil Scott-Heron
 Gildas
 Ginger Ninja
 Greg Phillinganes
 Herbie Hancock
 Horace Andy
 Isfar Sarabski
 Jack DeJohnette
 James Walsh
 Jamie Lidell
 Janelle Monáe
 Jessye Norman
 Joe Bonamassa
 John & Jehn
 John McLaughlin
 Julian Lage
 Julian Sartorius
 Kasper Bjoerke
 Katie Melua
 Keb' Mo'
 Kiss Kiss Kiss
 Klaus Doldinger
 Lionel Loueke
 Mark Knopfler
 Martina Topley-Bird
 Max Passante
 Mick Hucknall
 Midlake
 Midnight Juggernauts
 Missy Elliott
 Moonraisers
 Mumford and Sons
 Nas
 Norah Jones
 Oy
 Paco De Lucia
 Paulinho Da Costa
 Pepe Lienhard
 Petula Clark
 Phil Collins
 Piano Club
 Quincy Jones
 Regina Spektor
 Revolver
 Richard Bona
 Roger Cicero
 Roxy Music
 Roy Hargrove
 Seven
 Shantel & Bucovina Club Orkestar
 Shy Child
 Skip The Use
 Sophie Hunger
 Steve Mason
 The Awkwards
 The Black Box Revelation
 The Dead Weather
 The Drums
 The Maccabees
 The Mondrians
 The Twelves
 Tori Amos
 Tricky
 Uffie
 Vampire Weekend
 Vanessa Paradis
 Willy Mason
 Yacht
 Yaron Herman
 Youssou N'Dour

2011 
The 2011 edition of the festival featured performances of 142 artists:

 Afrika Bambaataa
 Alfredo Rodriguez
 Aloe Blacc
 Alpha Blondy
 Ana Carolina
 Andreas Vollenweider
 Anna Calvi
 Arcade Fire
 Arthur H
 Aṣa
 B.B. King
 Barem
 Bilal
 Black Dub
 Bo Tox
 Boogers 
 Bootsy Collins
 Brigitte
 Cobblestone Jazz
 Camille O'Sullivan
 Carlos Santana
 Carly Connor
 Cascadeur
 Chaka Khan
 Chapel Club
 Charles Bradley
 Chick Corea
 Christian McBride
 Christina Maria
 Claude Nobs
 Cody Chesnutt
 Cold War Kids
 Coolio
 Crocodiles
 Crystal Fighters
 Dave Grusin
 David Sanborn
 Deep Purple
 Derek Trucks
 Diana Krall
 Digital Underground
 Donavon Frankenreiter
 Dr. John
 Emily Bear
 Erik Truffaz
 Erika Stucky
 Esperanza Spalding
 Everlast
 Fatima 
 Fauve
 Femi Kuti
 Figurines
 Francisco Mela
 Frank Gambale
 Fred Lilla
 Friendly Fires
 Funeral Party
 George Benson
 Gerd Janson
 Gigi Radics
 Guano Apes
 Harold López-Nussa Torres
 Herbie Hancock
 House Of Pain
 Housse de Racket
 Imany
 Irma
 Jack Savoretti
 James Blake
 James Vincent McMorrow
 Jamie Woon
 Jean-Luc Ponty
 Jimmy Cliff
 Joe Sample
 John McLaughlin
 Katy B
 Lamb
 Larry Graham
 Laura Marling
 Lee Ritenour
 Lenny White
 Leon Russell
 Liza Minnelli
 Make It Pink
 Marcus Miller
 Maria Gadú
 Maria Rita
 Mario Biondi
 Melissa Auf Der Maur
 MF Doom
 Milow
 Milow The Girl
 Mogwai
 Monty Alexander
 Nasser
 Natalie Cole
 Naughty By Nature
 Nicolas Jaar
 Oh Land
 Olivia Pedroli
 Pantha Du Prince
 Paolo Nutini
 Patti Austin
 Paul Simon
 Philipp Fankhauser
 Quincy Jones
 Randy Crawford
 Raphael Saadiq
 Raul Midon
 Reptile and Retard
 Richard Bona
 Ricky Martin
 Robert Glasper Experiment
 Robert Randolph
 Ruben Blades
 Sanem Kalfa
 Seal
 Sly Johnson
 Sonny Emory
 Sophie Hunger
 St. Vincent
 Stanley Clarke
 Stef Kamil Clarens
 Sting
 Susan Tedeschi
 The Pretty Reckless
 The Shoes
 The Skatalites
 The Vaccines
 Tigran Hamasyan
 Tom Silverman
 Tommy Lipuma
 Trilok Gurtu
 Trixie Whitley
 Trombone Shorty
 Villagers
 Vinnie Who
 Vouipe
 Wayne Shorter
 Wu Lyf
 Youssou N'Dour
 Ziggy Marley

2012 
The 2012 edition of the festival featured performances of 125 artists:

 69 Chambers
 Active Child
 Adriana Calcanhotto
 AfroCubism
 Alabama Shakes
 Alanis Morissette
 Alex Clare
 Alfredo Rodriguez
 Amy Macdonald
 Andreas Varady
 Asbjorn
 Axelle Red
 Bastian Baker
 Bebe Winans
 Bob Dylan
 Bob James
 Bobby McFerrin
 Bombay Bicycle Club
 Bon Homme
 Breton
 Buddy Guy
 Butterscotch
 Buvette
 Chiara Izzi
 Chic
 Chicago Blues
 Chick Corea
 Chris Cornell
 Cidade Negra
 Citizens!
 College
 Diana Miranda
 Django Django
 Dr. John
 Ed Sheeran
 Electric Guest
 Emeli Sandé
 Erykah Badu
 First Aid Kit
 Four Tet
 Fourplay
 Frànçois and The Atlas Mountains
 Garland Jeffreys
 George Gruntz
 Giana Factory
 Gigi Radics
 Gilberto Gil
 Grace Jones
 Herbert Grönemeyer
 Herbie Hancock
 Hugh Laurie
 Isfar Sarabski
 James Carter Organ Trio
 Jamie N Commons
 Janelle Monáe
 Jessie J
 Jethro Tull
 Joe Bonamassa
 John McLaughlin
 John Medeski
 Jorge Ben Jor
 Juliette Gréco
 Kassav'
 Katie Melua
 Kavinsky
 Kimbra
 King Charles
 La Femme
 Labrinth
 Lana Del Rey
 Laura Leishman
 Lawson
 Lescop
 Lilabungalow
 Lionel Loueke
 Little Feat
 Luiz Melodia
 M.I.A.
 Mani Hoffman
 Mark Ronson
 Marlon Roudette
 Melody Gardot
 Michael Kiwanuka
 Nada Surf
 Nadeah
 Neil Cowley
 Neneh Cherry
 Nick Waterhouse
 Nightwish
 Niki & The Dove
 Nile Rodgers
 Noel Gallagher
 Odezenne
 Other Lives
 Paco De Lucia
 Pat Metheny
 Philipp Fankhauser
 Pitbull
 Poliça
 Quincy Jones
 Quinn Sullivan
 Radiorifle
 Rufus Wainwright
 Rumer
 Sarah Marie Young
 Sebastien Tellier
 Sergio Mendes
 Shearwater
 Soko
 Spectrum Road
 Taj Mahal
 The Brandt Bauer Frick Ensemble
 The National Fanfare Of Kadebostany
 The Pedrito Martinez Group
 The Young Professionals
 Theme Park
 Tiger And Wood
 Tony Bennett
 Totally Enormous Extinct Dinosaurs
 Trombone Shorty
 Van Morrison
 We Have Band
 Woodkid
 X X X Y
 Youssoupha

2013 
The 2013 edition of the festival featured performances of 117 artists:

 Alborosie
 Alex Hepburn
 AlunaGeorge
 Andrea Oliva
 Angel Haze
 Avishai Cohen 
 BadBadNotGood
 Ben Harper
 Ben Howard
 Ben Miller Band
 Billy Gibbons
 Black Rebel Motorcycle Club
 Bob James
 Bobby Womack
 Bonnie Raitt
 Brian May & Kerry Ellis
 Cat Power
 Charles Bradley
 Charles Lloyd
 Charlie Musselwhite
 Chief
 Chucho Valdés
 Claudia Leitte
 Daughter
 Dave Grusin
 Deep Purple
 Deluxe
 Devendra Banhart
 Diana Krall
 Dieter Meier
 Dinosaur Jr.
 Editors
 Eric Harland
 Flume
 Flying Lotus
 François Lindemann
 Gal Costa
 George Benson
 George Thorogood & The Destroyers
 Girls In Hawaii
 Grace Kelly Quintet
 Green Day
 Gregory Porter
 Hollie Cook
 Hugh Coltman
 IAM
 Iiro Rantala
 Jake Bugg
 James Blake
 James Morrison
 Jazz Funk Legends
 Joe Cocker
 Joe Sample
 Jonathan Batiste And The Stay Human
 Joris Delacroix
 José James
 Juveniles 
 Kat Edmonson
 Kendrick Lamar and Band
 Koqa
 Kraftwerk
 Kurt Rosenwinkel
 La Velle And Friends
 Larry Graham
 Lee Ritenour
 Leonard Cohen
 Leszek Mozdzer
 Lianne La Havas
 Marc Sway
 Marcus Miller
 Mark Lanegan Band
 Melodys Echo Chamber
 Michael Wollny
 Misja Fitzgerald Michel
 Of Monsters And Men
 Oleta Adams
 Olivier Koundouno
 Om Unit
 Orthodox Celts
 Paolo Conte
 Patrick Watson
 Patti Austin
 Paul Jackson Trio
 Paul Kalkbrenner
 Pee Wee Ellis
 Peter Von Poehl
 Philipp Fankhauser
 Prince
 Randy Crawford
 Richie Hawtin
 Rodriguez
 Rone
 Sadie And The Hotheads
 Seth Troxler
 Shemekia Copeland
 Shuggie Otis
 Sting
 Sugar Blue
 Superpoze
 Take 6
 The Hives
 The James Hunter Six
 The Lumineers
 The Parov Stelar Band
 Till Brönner
 Tobias Preisig
 Tony Joe White
 Trixie Whitley
 Tulipa Ruiz
 Twin Atlantic
 Two Door Cinema Club
 Valerie June
 Vijay Iyer Trio
 Wyclef Jean
 Yan Wagner
 Youn Sun Nah Duo
 ZZ Top
 Zakir Hussain

2014 
The 2014 edition of the festival featured performances of 163 artists:

 -M- (Matthieu Chedid)
 Adriatique
 Agnes Obel
 Akikazu Nakamura Forest
 Alim Quasimov Ensemble
 Amy Macdonald
 Angus & Julia Stone
 Annakin
 Antibalas Afrobeat Orchestra
 Archie Bronson Outfit
 Archive
 As Animals
 Ayo
 Babyshambles
 Banks
 Bastian Baker
 Benjamin Clementine
 Benoit Delbecq
 Biréli Lagrène
 Blue Note Tokyo All Star Orchestra
 Blues Pills
 Booker T. Jones
 Bosco Delrey
 Buddy Guy
 Buika
 Burhan Oçal
 Camion
 Charles Bradley
 Chet Faker
 Cheyenne
 Chris Rea
 Damon Albarn
 Daniel Avery
 Danton Eeprom
 Dark Horses
 Darkside
 Dave Grusin
 Dave Holland
 Derek Trucks
 Didier Lockwood
 Dirty Loops
 Downtown Boogie
 Dr. John
 Drenge
 Ed Sheeran
 Eels
 Eric Harland
 Etienne Daho
 Everlast
 Fat White Family
 Fauve
 Fingertrap
 Fink
 Forks
 François Lindemann
 Goldfrapp
 Gramatik
 H Zettrio
 Harri Stojka & Hot Club De Vienne
 Herbie Hancock
 Hiromi Uehara
 Horace Andy
 Hotei
 Isfar Sarabski
 Iván "Melon" Lewis
 Jack DeJohnette
 Jack Savoretti
 Jamie Cullum
 Javier Limón
 Jerry Leonide
 Joey Badass
 John Scofield
 Julian Sartorius
 Jungle
 Kaytranada
 Keb' Mo'
 Kruger
 Kuroma
 Laura Mvula
 Leandro Pellegrino
 Lee Ritenour
 Leo Tardin
 Leszek Mozdzer
 Lizz Wright
 London Grammar
 Lorenz Kellhuber
 Louisahhh
 Lucas Ramirez
 Lykke Li
 MGMT
 Mac Miller
 Maceo Parker
 Maceo Plex
 Magos & Limón
 Manu Katché
 Manu Lanvin
 Massive Attack
 Matias Aguayo
 Mavis Staples
 Melanie De Biasio
 Melissa Laveaux
 Metronomy
 Michael Kiwanuka
 Mighty Oaks
 Milky Chance
 Miyavi
 Moderat
 Monsieur Monsieur
 Monty Alexander
 Morcheeba
 Mulatu Astatke
 Myrczek Wojtek
 NTO
 Neil Cowley
 Nicolas Jaar
 Norma Jean Martine
 Oh! Tiger Mountain
 OutKast
 Paloma Faith
 Passenger
 Peter Cincotti
 Pharrell Williams
 Plaistow
 Prism
 Quincy Jones
 Quinn Sullivan
 RY X
 Ravi Coltrane
 Redlie
 Ricardo Villalobos
 Richard Bona
 Richard Galliano
 Robert Plant
 Robin Thicke
 Rocky
 Rodrigo Y Gabriela
 Selah Sue
 Sharon Jones
 Sohn
 Sonny Catanese
 Sonny Emory
 Stephan Eicher
 Stevie Wonder
 Susan Tedeschi
 Sweet Georgia Brown
 Tale Of Us
 Temples
 Terri Lyne Carrington
 Terri Lyne Carrington and the Mosaic Project
 The Beauty of Gemina
 The Daptone Super Soul Revue
 The Jezabels
 The Revox
 The Trap
 Thomas Dutronc
 Tigran Hamasyan
 Tiken Jah Fakoly
 Van Morrison
 Von Pariahs
 Wayne Shorter
 Wojciech Myrczek
 Woodkid
 Yaron Herman
 Òlafur Arnalds

2015 
The 2015 edition of the festival featured performances of 158 artists:

 -M- (Matthieu Chedid)
 A Bu
 ASAP Rocky
 AaRON
 Al Jarreau
 Alabama Shakes
 Alex Goodman
 Alita Moses
 Aloe Blacc
 Amiyna Farouque
 André Rio
 Anna Calvi
 Asaf Avidan
 Avishai Cohen 
 Barrio Latino
 Baxter Dury
 Ben Klock
 Benjamin Booker
 Birth Of Joy
 Bob Spring
 Brodinski
 Bugge Wesseltoft
 Buraka Som Sistema
 Caetano Veloso
 Canto Cego
 Carlos Santana
 Caro Emerald
 Chick Corea
 Christian McBride
 Climax Blues Band
 D'Angelo
 Damien Rice
 David August
 David Sanborn
 David Tixier
 Dhafer Youssef
 Diana Miranda
 Dianne Reeves
 Die Antwoord
 Downtown Boogie
 Dub Inc
 Emeli Sandé
 Erik Truffaz
 Fakear
 Foals
 Foxygen
 Fred Wesley
 Fritz Kalkbrenner
 Fumaça Preta
 George Benson
 George Ezra
 Gilberto Gil
 Ginkgoa
 Giufa
 Hector Quintana
 Herbie Hancock
 Hiatus Kaiyote
 Hot Chip
 Hudson Mohawke
 Hugh Coltman
 Ibeyi
 Jack Garratt
 Jackson Browne
 Jacob Collier
 James Blake
 James Vincent McMorrow
 Jamie xx
 Jason Moran
 Jerry Leonide
 John Dear
 John Legend
 John McLaughlin
 John Talabot
 Joke
 Joshua Redman
 Justin Kauflin
 Kabak
 KiNK
 Kid Wise
 Kill It Kid
 Kurt Rosenwinkel
 Kwabs
 Lady Gaga
 Lenny Kravitz
 Lilly Wood & The Prick
 Lionel Richie
 Liv Warfield And The NPG Hornz
 Lizz Wright
 Lorenz Kellhuber
 Los Lobos
 Lost Frequencies
 Louis, Matthieu, Joseph & Anna Chedid
 MXD
 Marc Kelly
 Maria Gadú
 Marmozets
 Mary J. Blige
 Mathis Picard
 Matias Aguayo
 Matthieu Chedid
 Melody Gardot
 Minuit
 Monica Heldal
 Nick Mulvey
 Nikki Hill
 Nils Frahm
 Nils Petter Molvaer
 Odesza
 Oscar and the Wolf
 Out of Law
 Paolo Nutini
 Paralog And Gabriel Zufferey
 Paula Grande
 Pierre Omers Swing Revue
 Polar
 Portishead
 Protoje and the Indiggnation
 Rae Morris
 Ruthie Foster
 Sbtrkt
 Sam Smith
 Sebastien Schuller
 Serpentyne
 Sinéad O'Connor
 Sly And Robbie
 Soak
 Somi
 Songhoy Blues
 Sophie Hunger
 Suns Of Thyme
 T'Dòz
 Taken By Storm
 Teki Latex & Orgasmic
 The Avener
 The Chemical Brothers
 The Gentle Storm
 The Kooks
 The Staves
 The Two
 The Vintage Caravan
 The War On Drugs
 Thought Forms
 Thylacine
 Tobey Lucas
 Tobias Preisig
 Tommy Castro
 Tony Bennett
 Toto
 Trio Da Kali
 Unknown Mortal Orchestra
 Vein
 Wolfman
 Yaron Herman
 Yoav Eshed
 Zaz
 Ziv Ravitz
 alt-J
 dEUS

2016 
The 2016 edition of the festival featured performances of 110 artists:

 ASAP Ferg
 Academie Suisse De Cor Des Alpes
 Alex Attias
 Allah-Las
 Amine Mraihi
 Antonio Farao
 Apollonia
 Aruan Ortiz Trio
 Aurora
 Basia Bulat
 Beirut
 Bill Evans
 Carolyn Wonderland
 Cécile McLorin Salvant
 Chico Freeman
 Crows
 DBFC 
 Dalton Telegramme
 Dave Holland
 Dennis Chambers
 DJ Shadow
 Dobet Gnahoré
 Ernest Ranglin and Friends
 Esteban Castro
 FKJ 
 Fai Baba
 Fanny Leeb
 Feu! Chatterton
 Floating Points
 Flume
 Four Tet
 François Lindemann
 French Quarter
 Garfield High School Jazz Ensemble
 Georgio
 Gipsy Sound System Orkestra
 Glen Hansard
 Glen Matlock
 Gogo Penguin
 Grimes
 Haelos
 Han Seung Seok & Jung Jaeil
 Heymoonshaker
 I Kong And Njavibes
 Jack Broadbent
 Jean-Michel Jarre
 Jeanne Added
 Jeremy Loops
 Joe Farmer
 José González
 Kenny Barron
 Kiasmos
 Kilmister
 Kurt Vile & The Violators
 Lana Del Rey
 Laolu
 Last Train
 Le Flappers Burlesque Show On Tour
 Les Innocents
 Lisa Simone
 Little Dreams Band
 Lola Marsh
 Lou Doillon
 Lura
 MHD
 Matt Corby
 Max Cooper
 Max Jury
 Meshuggah
 Montreux Jazz Choir
 Mura Masa
 Nadja Zela
 Nathaniel Ratellif And The Night Sweats
 Nik Bartsch
 PJ Harvey
 Peter Kernel
 Petit Biscuit
 Rag'n'Bone Man
 Randy Weston
 Richard Bona & Mandekan Cubano
 Robben Ford
 Selwyn Birchwood
 Sigur Rós
 Simply Red
 Son Lux
 Stade
 The Animen
 The Deaf
 The Jerry Khan Bangers
 The K.
 The Moorings
 The Peacoks
 The Two Romans
 The Wild Guys
 Thimothy Jaromir
 Trio Teriba
 Ty Dolla Sign
 Ulf Wakenius
 Vald
 Vanessa Da Mata
 Verna Von Horsten
 Vintage Trouble
 Volcan
 What You Know
 Woodkid
 Yak
 Young Thug
 ZZ Top
 Zappa The Black Page Experience
 Ziv Ravitz
 Ásgeir

2017
The 2017 edition of the festival featured performances of 66 artists:

Ambrose Akinmusire
Bachspace
Benjamin Biolay
Bonobo
Casey
Charlie Cunningham
Chilly Gonzales
Cigarettes After Sex
Donny McCaslin Quartet
Elmhurst College Jazz Band
Esteban Castro
Federico Albanese
File Under Zawinul
Flatbush Zombies
Fleet Foxes
Gabriel Garzón-Montano
Gucci Mane
Hamilton Leithauser
Ibrahim Maalouf
Imelda Gabs
Jacob Karlzon
Jacques
Joey Alexander Trio
John Newman
Junior Tshaka
Kery James
Kevin Morby
Macy Gray
Maggie Rogers
Makala
Malika Favre
Max Richter
Muthoni Drummer Queen
Nicolas Cruz
Nicolas Jaar
Nicolas Noir
Noa Duo
Olli Hirvonen
Paradis
Pedestrians
Peter Broderick
Phoenix
Ramsey Lewis
Romare
Roméo Elvis
Roosevelt
Royal Blood
Sampha
Sarah McKenzie
Sax Summit
Shabaka and the Ancestors
Slaves
Slimka
Soulwax
Superwak Clique
Tash Sultana
The Bloody Beetroots
The Lemon Twigs
The New Power Generation
Theo Croker
Tia Brazda
Tom Jones
Usher and The Roots
Whitney
Wolfgang Muthspiel
Youngr

2018
The 2018 edition of the festival was held on June 29 to July 14.

2019
The 2019 edition of the festival saw Elton John offer a historic show at Saussaz Stadium before 15,000 people. This is the festival's first-ever stadium concert.

Artists with most performances

27 times 
 Herbie Hancock (1979, 1981, 1983, 19861994, 19961999, 2001, 2002, 2004, 2006, 20082012, 2014, 2015)

21 times 
 B.B. King (1979, 1980, 1982, 1984, 1987, 19891991, 1993, 1995, 19972002, 20042006, 2009, 2011)

18 times 
 George Duke (1976, 1977, 19861989, 19911993, 19962001, 2005, 2006, 2009)
 John McLaughlin (1974, 19761978, 1981, 1984, 1987, 1993, 1995, 1996, 1998, 1999, 2001, 20092012, 2015)
 Van Morrison (1974, 1980, 1984, 1989, 1990, 19941999, 2001, 2003, 2004, 2006, 2007, 2012, 2014)

17 times 
 Al Jarreau (1976, 19791981, 1986, 1990, 1991, 1993, 1996, 1998, 2000, 2002, 2004, 2006, 2007, 2010, 2015)

16 times 
 George Benson (1986, 19881991, 1995, 1996, 1998, 2000, 2003, 2005, 2007, 2009, 2011, 2013, 2015)

15 times 
 David Sanborn (1981, 1984, 1986, 1988, 1990, 1991, 1993, 1996, 1997, 1999, 2000, 2002, 2009, 2011, 2015)

14 times 
 Monty Alexander (1976, 1977, 1981, 1984, 1987, 1988, 19931995, 1997, 2008, 2009, 2011, 2014)

13 times 
 Gilberto Gil (1978, 1982, 1986, 1991, 1993, 1997, 1998, 2001, 2003, 2006, 2008, 2012, 2015)
 John Scofield (1975, 1976, 19841986, 1993, 1994, 1997, 2002, 2004, 2007, 2009, 2014)
 Stanley Clarke (1972, 1977, 1980, 1988, 1989, 1991, 1994, 1999, 2005, 2006, 2008, 2009, 2011)
 Wayne Shorter (1976, 1979, 1986, 1988, 19901992, 1996, 2001, 2002, 2004, 2011, 2014)

12 times 
 Chick Corea (1972, 1979, 1981, 1988, 1993, 1997, 2001, 2008, 20102012, 2015)

11 times 
 Clark Terry (1969, 1970, 19751978, 1983, 1988, 1991, 1992, 1999)
 Claude Nobs (1980, 1982, 1983, 19901992, 1997, 1999, 2002, 2009, 2011)
 Joe Sample (1982, 1990, 1993, 1997, 2000, 2002, 2003, 2005, 2008, 2011, 2013)
 Klaus Doldinger (1972, 19751977, 1980, 1984, 1993, 1998, 2001, 2006, 2010)
 Randy Crawford (1981, 1986, 1990, 1992, 1995, 2003, 2005, 2006, 2008, 2011, 2013)

10 times 
 Billy Cobham (19741978, 19811983, 1998, 2010)
 Bobby McFerrin (1982, 1984, 1988, 1992, 1994, 1997, 2001, 2004, 2005, 2012)
 Buddy Guy (1974, 1978, 1983, 1992, 1998, 2002, 2008, 2010, 2012, 2014)

External links 
 Montreux Jazz Concerts Database

References

Montreux